PSB Academy is a private educational institution that offers Certificates, Diplomas, Bachelor's and master's degree programmes in Singapore. PSB Academy is registered under the Committee for Private Education (CPE).

There is six schools – which include School of Foundation Studies, School of Business and Management, School of Engineering and Technology, School of Life and Physical Science, School of Postgraduate Studies and Digital Academy.

History
Once a division of Singapore's National Productivity Board (NPB), the Management Services Supervisory Development division was formalised into a full-fledged institution - the Institute for Productivity Training (IPT) in 1988, with the aim of upgrading the knowledge and skills of the workforce.

It was later corporatised in 2001 and privatised in 2006.

Ownership

2001 - 2006: Productivity and Standards Board/SPRING/NPB
2006 - 2013: TUV SUD
Jan 2013 - Jan 2018: Baring Private Equity Asia
Jan 2018–present: Intermediate Capital Group

Campuses
PSB Academy has two campuses in Singapore. The city campus is located at Marina Square, while the STEM campus is located at Jackson Square in Toa Payoh.

Graduate employment
In a survey conducted by Committee for Private Education on employment outcomes of 2018, graduates of PSB Academy achieved a 45.3% full-time employment rate in comparison with 78.4% for their peers from three autonomous universities - the National University of Singapore (NUS), Nanyang Technological University (NTU) and Singapore Management University (SMU). This result is lower than post-national service polytechnic graduates whose full-time employment rate was 64%. The response rate to the survey was 21%.

It also revealed that PSB Academy graduates earned median gross starting salaries of $2,500 a month, while NUS, NTU and SMU graduates earned $3,400. Post-NS polytechnic graduates earned $2,480 a month.

Accreditations
 4-year EduTrust
 Council for Private Education

References

External links

 Official website

Private universities in Singapore
Educational institutions established in 1964
1964 establishments in Singapore